Ayrton shunt or universal shunt is a high-resistance shunt used in galvanometers to increase their range without changing the damping.
The circuit is named after its inventor William E. Ayrton. Multirange ammeters that use this technique are more accurate than those using a make-before-break switch. Also it will eliminate the possibility of having a meter without a shunt which is a serious concern in make-before-break switches.

The selector switch changes the amount of resistance in parallel with Rm (meter resistance). The voltage drop across parallel branches is always equal. When all resistances are placed in parallel with Rm maximum sensitivity of ammeter is reached.

Ayrton shunt is rarely used for currents above 10 amperes.

m1 = I1/Im  , m2 = I2/Im, m3 = I3/Im

References

Sources

Electrical circuits
Electrical meters